Marco Manso (born 9 October 1973) is a Brazilian former footballer and manager.

Career

Club career

In 1996, Manso signed for Saudi Arabian side Hajer Club. In 1997, he signed for Naxxar Lions in Malta. Before the 1999 season, Manso signed for MYPA in Finland, where he made 116 league appearances and scored 29 goals. Before the 2004 season, he signed for Malaysian team Kedah. Before the 2005 season, Manso returned to MYPA in Finland, helping them win their only league title.

Managerial career

In 2015, he was appointed director of Slovak third tier outfit FC ŠTK 1914 Šamorín. In 2019, he was appointed CEO of Roeselare in the Belgian second tier.

References

External links
 Marco Manso at playmakerstats.com

1973 births
Association football midfielders
Brazilian expatriate footballers
Brazilian expatriate sportspeople in Belgium
Brazilian expatriate sportspeople in Finland
Brazilian expatriate sportspeople in Malaysia
Brazilian expatriate sportspeople in Malta
Brazilian expatriate sportspeople in Saudi Arabia
Brazilian expatriate sportspeople in Slovakia
Brazilian footballers
Expatriate football managers in Slovakia
Expatriate footballers in Finland
Expatriate footballers in Malaysia
Expatriate footballers in Malta
Ferroviário Atlético Clube (CE) players
Expatriate footballers in Saudi Arabia
Hajer FC players
Kedah Darul Aman F.C. players
Living people
Malaysia Super League players
Maltese Premier League players
Myllykosken Pallo −47 players
Naxxar Lions F.C. players
Red Bull Bragantino players
Saudi Professional League players
Veikkausliiga players